XHNVG-FM is a radio station on 104.9 FM in Nuevo Casas Grandes, Chihuahua, Mexico. It is owned by Grupo BM Radio.

History
XHNVG received its concession on November 16, 1994 and has maintained the same ownership throughout its history. The original concessionaire was Israel Beltrán Montes, who died in 2022.

References

Radio stations in Chihuahua